Westerdale is a scattered crofting village which lies on the River Thurso, located  directly south of Halkirk, in Caithness, Highland, Scotland. The B870 road passes through the village.

The River Thurso flows past the village.

References

Populated places in Caithness